Zlatko Arambasic (born 20 September 1969) is a former Australian football player, now residing in Australia as an educator.

Club career
A much-travelled striker, Arambašić, a Croatia-born Australian, played for several clubs in Europe and in Australia. He had three different spells at Belgian outfit Mechelen and played in France for FC Metz.

International career
He played at the 1992 Summer Olympics but never a full international for the senior team.

References

External links
 OzFootball Profile
 
 
 Zlatko Arambasic Interview

1969 births
Living people
Croatian emigrants to Australia
Footballers from Split, Croatia
Australian soccer players
Australian expatriate soccer players
Olympic soccer players of Australia
Footballers at the 1992 Summer Olympics
Blacktown City FC players
Sydney Olympic FC players
K.V. Mechelen players
FC Metz players
K.V. Oostende players
Ligue 1 players
National Soccer League (Australia) players
NAC Breda players
R. Charleroi S.C. players
RBC Roosendaal players
Sydney United 58 FC players
Parramatta Power players
APIA Leichhardt FC players
Australian soccer coaches
Sydney United 58 FC managers
Belgian Pro League players
Expatriate footballers in France
Expatriate footballers in the Netherlands
Expatriate footballers in Belgium
Australian expatriate sportspeople in the Netherlands
Association football forwards